Luis de Grandes Pascual (born 27 January 1945 in Guadalajara) is a Spanish politician and Member of the European Parliament with the People's Party (PP), part of the European People's Party and sits on the European Parliament's Committee on Transport and Tourism.

He is a substitute for the Committee on Legal Affairs, a member of the Delegation to the EU-Chile Joint Parliamentary Committee and a substitute for the Delegation for relations with the countries of Central America.

Grandes entered politics in 1977 when he was elected as a UCD deputy for Guadalajara in the Spanish General Election. He was re-elected in 1979 but lost his seat at the 1982 election. When the UCD disbanded in February 1983, he joined the Democratic Popular Party (PDP) and returned to Congress at the 1986 election. The PDP merged with other parties in 1989 to form the current PP, for whom he was re-elected at the 1989, 1993, 1996, 2000 and 2004 General Elections.

Education
 Graduate in law
 Law degree and doctoral studies (Law Faculty, Complutense University, Madrid)
 Practising lawyer and member of the bar associations of Guadalajara and Alcalá de Henares (Madrid)
 Secretary-General for Youth in the National Executive of the UCD party
 UCD National Organisation Secretary
 National Secretary-General of the Christian Democrats (PDP)
 Member of the PP National Executive Committee
 Chairman of the PP Provincial and Regional Electoral Committee

Career
 1983-1987 and 1991-1995: Member of the Regional Parliament of Castile-La Mancha and spokesman of the PP parliamentary group
 1996-2000 and 2000-2004: Member of the Spanish Congress of Deputies (1977–1979, 1979–1982, 1986–1989, 1993–1996
 1996-2004: Spokesman for the PP parliamentary group in the Spanish Congress of Deputies
 1977-1979: Third Secretary of the Bureau of the Chamber of Deputies and member of the Constitutional Committee in the Constituent Assembly
 Patron of the Foundation for Analysis and Social Studies and of the Foundation for Humanism and Democracy

Decorations
 Order of Constitutional Merit (Spain)
 Order of Bernardo O'Higgins (Chile)

See also
 2004 European Parliament election in Spain

External links
 
 
 His overview page at the Senate
 Former functions in the Senate

1945 births
Living people
Members of the constituent Congress of Deputies (Spain)
Members of the 1st Congress of Deputies (Spain)
Members of the 3rd Congress of Deputies (Spain)
Members of the 4th Congress of Deputies (Spain)
Members of the 5th Congress of Deputies (Spain)
Members of the 6th Congress of Deputies (Spain)
Members of the 7th Congress of Deputies (Spain)
Members of the 8th Congress of Deputies (Spain)
Recipients of the Order of Constitutional Merit
People's Party (Spain) MEPs
MEPs for Spain 2004–2009
MEPs for Spain 2009–2014
Union of the Democratic Centre (Spain) politicians
MEPs for Spain 2014–2019
Members of the 1st Cortes of Castilla–La Mancha
Members of the 3rd Cortes of Castilla–La Mancha
Members of the Cortes of Castilla–La Mancha from Guadalajara